Maudite soit la guerre is a 1914 Belgian silent anti-war film directed and scripted by Alfred Machin, starring Baert. The film shows how war destroys love and friendship through the story of two friends obliged to fight each other as pilots in the Air Force of their respective (unnamed) countries. The film, released just before the beginning of World War I, is one of the oldest anti-war films ever made and includes a remarkable anticipation of aerial warfare.

Plot
Adolphe, a student pilot, is training at the aviation school of a neighbouring land, where he is staying at the house of his friend Sigismond. He falls in love with Sigismond's sister Liza. When a war breaks out between their two countries, Adolphe is forced to go home and the two men are enlisted in their respective Air Forces. Adolphe makes several successful missions, destroying in particular a number of gas balloons, until Sigismond attacks his plane and forces him to land. Both are killed in the ensuing fight, unaware of their identities. Lieutenant Maxime, who had witnessed Sigismond's death, visit his parents to pay tribute to their son. He is strongly impressed by Liza. One year later, he ask for Liza's hand. During a walk in a forest, Liza recognises the four leaf clover medal that he is wearing, which belonged to Adolphe. He tells her how he took it from the body of the enemy pilot who had killed Sigismond. Liza runs away, contemplating suicide. She finally decides to retire in a convent but is unable to forget her lost love.

Cast

Baert as Adolphe Hardeff
Suzanne Berni as Liza Modzel
Fernand Crommelynck as Monsieur Modzel
Nadia D'Angely as Madame Modzel
Henri Goidsen as Lieutenant Maxime

Production and release
The film was shot in Belgium in 1913. It has a very high production value, with the reconstitution of ground and aerial fights which were made possible thanks to the support of the Belgian Armed Forces, notably the precursor of the Belgium Air Force, the Compagnie des Aviateurs, created on 16 April 1913. It made available a number of men, horses, weapons, gas balloons and planes.

The film premièred on 1 May 1914 in Brussels.

Restoration

The film was restored in 2014 by the Royal Belgian Film Archive in collaboration with the EYE Film Institute Netherlands, and the support of the Bibliothèque Nationale de France and Gaumont-Pathé Archives, based on two stencil-coloured prints and a black and white print.

This is the version available here, with Dutch and English intertitles and no soundtrack.

References

External links
 
Maudite soit la guerre (1914) Damn the War at A Cinema History

1914 films
Anti-war films about World War I
Belgian black-and-white films
Silent films
Belgian war films
1914 war films
French-language Belgian films
1910s French-language films